Kevin Huizenga (born March 29, 1977 in Harvey, Illinois, USA) is an American cartoonist, best known as the creator of the comics character Glenn Ganges, who appears in most of his work.

Biography
Kevin first created the minicomic Supermonster (1993–2001) while he was still in high school. This is where the character of Glenn Ganges first appeared. The first issue of Huizenga's ongoing Or Else comic received the Ignatz Award for Outstanding Comic in 2005. Both Or Else and a collection of works, Curses were included on Time Magazine's list of the Top Ten comics of 2005 and 2006, respectively.

Since February 2008, Kevin Huizenga has published a comic strip called Amazing Facts and Beyond with Leon Beyond in the St Louis Riverfront Times with cartoonists Dan Zettwoch and Ted May. New strips appear three times a month.

Bibliography

Books 
 The River at Night, Drawn & Quarterly (2019)
 Amazing Facts and Beyond with Leon Beyond with Dan Zettwoch, Uncivilized Books (2013)
 Gloriana, Drawn & Quarterly (2012)
 Alla Prima (2012)
 Wild Kingdom, Drawn & Quarterly (2010)
 Curses, Drawn & Quarterly (2006)

Comic Books 
 Ganges #1-5, Fantagraphics (2006 - 2016)
 Or Else #1-5, Drawn & Quarterly (2004 - 2008)
 Fight or Run: Shadow of the Chopper, Buenaventura Press (2008)
 New Construction #1-2
 Sermons #1-2
 The Feathered Ogre: Designs and Sketches
 Super Monster #1-14

Anthologies with his stories 
 Kramers Ergot 8, PictureBox
 Kramers Ergot 7, Buenaventura Press
 Kramers Ergot 5, Buenaventura Press
 Showcase #1, Drawn & Quarterly
 Orchid, Sparkplug Comics
 Bogus Dead
 Impossible (Magazines #1 & #3)
 The Best American Comics 2007, Houghton Mifflin
 The Best American Comics 2009, Houghton Mifflin

Awards
 2010 Ignatz Award for Outstanding Series for Ganges
 2007 Ignatz Award for Outstanding Anthology or Collection for Curses
 2006 Ignatz Award for Outstanding Story for Ganges #1
 2005 Ignatz Award for Outstanding Comic for Or Else #1
 2004 Ignatz Award for Outstanding Story for “Glenn Ganges”, Drawn & Quarterly Showcase Volume 1

References

External links
 Kevin Huizenga's Catastrophe Site
 The Balloonist - Kevin Huizenga's Blog
 Kevin Huizenga's Drawn & Quarterly Artist Page
 Amazing Facts and Beyond with Leon Beyond

Interviews

 Read This, Or Else: Interview//Time Traveling with Kevin Huizenga - Comic Foundry June 1, 2006
 A Short Interview with Kevin Huizenga - The Comics Reporter March 30, 2004

Reviews

Review of Ganges #1, #2, #3, #4, Comics Bulletin

Alternative cartoonists
American cartoonists
American animators
American comics artists
American comics writers
1977 births
Living people
People from Harvey, Illinois
Ignatz Award winners